M. Sawkat Anwer is an American bioscientist. He's currently a Distinguished Professor of biomedical sciences at Tufts University.

References

Year of birth missing (living people)
Living people
Tufts University faculty
21st-century American biologists
Kansas State University alumni